The ancient Egyptian Hare hieroglyph, Gardiner sign listed no. E34 (𓃹) is a portrayal of the desert hare or Cape hare, Lepus capensis of Egypt, within the Gardiner signs for mammals. The ancients used the name of sekhat for the hare.

It is an Egyptian language biliteral with the value wn, (or un), often used in a hieroglyph composition block with the horizontal n. E34:N35:N35 or E34:N35

The biliteral expresses the sound "oon", or "oonen",; it is also an ideogram for the verb "to be", or "to exist", (i.e. "is", "are", "was", etc.).

The famous Pharaoh Unas, (for his Pyramid texts), is named using the hare hieroglyph. It also appears in the name of Wenamun, a (possibly fictional) priest who appears in a famous history of c. 1000 BCE.

}

See also

Gardiner's Sign List#E. Mammals
List of Egyptian hieroglyphs
Pharaoh Unas - (titulary)

References

Schumann-Antelme, and Rossini, 1998. Illustrated Hieroglyphics Handbook, Ruth Schumann-Antelme, and Stéphane Rossini. c 1998, English trans. 2002, Sterling Publishing Co. (Index, Summary lists (tables), selected uniliterals, biliterals, and triliterals.) (softcover)

Leporidae
Egyptian hieroglyphs: mammals